Bronte Halligan (born 12 August 1996) is an Australian water polo player.

Halligan was a member of the Australian Stingrays squad that competed at the Tokyo 2020 Olympics. The head coach was Predrag Mihailović. By finishing second in their pool, the Aussie Stingers went through to the quarterfinals. They were beaten 8-9 by Russia and therefore did not compete for an Olympic medal. Australia at the 2020 Summer Olympics details the team's performance in depth.

References

External links
 UCLA Bruins bio

1996 births
Living people
Water polo players from Sydney
Water polo players at the 2020 Summer Olympics
Australian female water polo players
Olympic water polo players of Australia
UCLA Bruins women's water polo players
21st-century Australian women